Olfersia is a genus of ferns in the family Dryopteridaceae, subfamily Polybotryoideae, in the Pteridophyte Phylogeny Group classification of 2016 (PPG I). They are found in Mexico and parts of South America.

The genus name of Olfersia is in honour of Ignaz Franz Werner Maria von Olfers (1793–1871), who was a German naturalist, historian and diplomat. 

The genus was circumscribed by Giuseppe Raddi in Opusc. Sci. vol.3 on page 283 in 1819.

Species
, the Checklist of Ferns and Lycophytes of the World accepted the following species:
Olfersia alata C.Sánchez & Caluff
Olfersia cervina (L.) Kunze
Olfersia macrostegia (Hook.) comb. ined.
Olfersia ochropteroides  (Baker) comb. ined.

, Plants of the World Online only accepts Olfersia alata  and Olfersia cervina

Native
They are found in Belize, Bolivia, Brazil, Colombia, Costa Rica, Cuba, Dominican Republic, Ecuador, French Guiana, Guatemala, Guyana, Haiti, Honduras, Jamaica, Leeward Islands, Mexico, Nicaragua, Panamá, Peru, Puerto Rico, Suriname, Venezuela, Venezuelan Antilles and the Windward Islands.

References

Dryopteridaceae
Fern genera
Flora of Mexico
Flora of Central America
Flora of the Caribbean
Flora of northern South America
Flora of western South America
Flora of Brazil